The following is a list of notable individuals associated with St. John's College in Annapolis, Maryland and/or Santa Fe, New Mexico.

Faculty 
 Douglas Allanbrook, tutor, musician and composer
 Wye Jamison Allanbrook, tutor, musicologist
 Eva Brann, tutor, dean; 2005 recipient of the National Humanities Medal
 James M. Cain, novelist; professor of journalism 1923–24
 Elliott Carter, composer; tutor, 1939–1941
 William Hersey Hopkins academic, first president of Goucher College, former acting president of St. John's College
 Leon Kass, tutor at the college (1972–76); chair of the President's Council on Bioethics (2002–06)
 Jacob Klein, tutor, dean; author of Greek Mathematical Thought and the Origin of Algebra and Commentary on Plato's Meno; leading 20th-century Platonist
 Sara Larkin, artist; creator of Spacescapes
 Leo Strauss (1899–1973), political philosopher; lectured at St. John's and was the Scott Buchanan Distinguished Scholar in Residence at the Annapolis campus
 Victor Zuckerkandl, tutor, music theorist

Students and Alumni 
This includes both graduates of the Undergraduate and Graduate programs.

Academics 

 Rogers Albritton, philosopher; served as the chairman of both Harvard and UCLA's philosophy departments
 Joseph J. Himmel, Jesuit missionary and president of Georgetown University
 Thomas J.J. Altizer, theologian, author of The Gospel of Christian Atheism
 John Bremer, educator, philosopher, author; after graduating from Oxford University, he came to St. John's College in 1951 on a Fulbright Fellowship
 Mark D. Jordan, alumnus; Andrew Mellon Professor, Harvard Divinity School; scholar of gender studies, sexual ethics, and theology
 Wilfred M. McClay, intellectual historian
 Ange Mlinko, poet and critic. Guggenheim Fellow 2014–15, Poetry Editor of the Nation, associate professor at the University of Florida
 Tom G. Palmer, Senior Fellow at the Cato Institute
 Ben Sasse, president, University of Florida
Pamela Sklar (1959–2017), psychiatrist and neuroscientist
Louis Leo Snyder (1907–1993), German scholar and historian
Graham Harman, philosopher

Writers, critics, and journalists 

Michael Anton, writer; former Deputy Assistant to the President for Strategic Communications.
Seth Cropsey, Director of the Center for American Seapower at the Hudson Institute; regular contributor to the National Review
Robert A. George, journalist and news columnist
William Kowalski, author, Eddie's Bastard, Somewhere South of Here, The Adventures of Flash Jackson, The Good Neighbor
Kenneth Kronberg, printing company owner, former LaRouche movement member
Tony Lagouranis, activist and author of Fear Up Harsh: An Army Interrogator's Dark Journey through Iraq
Lydia Polgreen, Editor-in-Chief for The Huffington Post, 2006 winner of the George Polk Award
James Portnow writer, game designer, co-founder of the Extra Credits YouTube channel.
Salvatore Scibona, alumnus and author, 2008 National Book Award finalist for his first novel The End; his fiction has appeared in many literary journals; named one of "20 under 40" notable authors by The New Yorker in 2010 and published an essay about his experience at the college in the June 13, 2011 issue
Lisa Simeone, National Public Radio host
Cecelia Watson, alumna and author of Semicolon: The Past, Present, and Future of a Misunderstood Mark
John C. Wright, alumnus and author

Military personnel 

Lewis J. Fields (1909–1988), United States Marine Corps Lieutenant general
William H. Harrison (1896–1955), brigadier general in the Marine Corps during World War II
Erik S. Kristensen (1972–2005), U.S. Navy Seal, attended Graduate Institute in Annapolis, killed in action in Afghanistan
James B. Lockwood (1852–1884), American army officer and arctic explorer.
Robert Houston Noble, U.S. Army brigadier general, honorary Master of Arts, 1894
Reginald H. Ridgely Jr. (1902–1979), U.S. Marine Corps lieutenant general, POW during World War II

Politicians 

Michael Anton, essayist, speechwriter and former private-equity executive who previously a senior national security official 
Joshua J. Cohen, Mayor of Annapolis, Maryland
Clement Dorsey, Congressman for Maryland's 1st congressional district, 1825–31
Alexander Contee Hanson, Congressman for Maryland's 3rd District, 1813–1816
Emerson Harrington, Governor of Maryland
J. T. C. Hopkins (1843–1922), Maryland state delegate
Reverdy Johnson, statesman and Jurist, defense attorney of Sandford in the Dred Scott Case
Arturs Krišjānis Kariņš, Prime Minister of Latvia, 2019-present
John Leeds Kerr, U.S. Representative, Maryland's 7th District
Francis Scott Key, United States Attorney for the District of Columbia; lyricist of the United States national anthem, The Star-Spangled Banner
Daniel Martin, Governor of Maryland, 1829–1830, 1831
Keith Neville, 18th Governor of Nebraska, 1917–1919
Thomas Parran Jr., sixth Surgeon General of the United States
William Pinkney (1764–1822), 7th Attorney General of the United States
Ben Sasse, US Senator, Nebraska

Lucy Tamlyn, U.S. Ambassador to Benin
Francis Thomas, Governor of Maryland, 1842–44; member of House of Representatives, 1861–69
Dr. Tobias Watkins (1780-1855), 4th Auditor of the United States Treasury, writer, editor, and physician

Filmmakers and musicians 

 Dimitri Devyatkin, Emmy-nominated video artist and filmmaker
 Ahmet Ertegün, founded Atlantic Records in 1947
 Jac Holzman, founded Elektra Records in 1950 while a student at St. John's
 Eilen Jewell, blues and Americana singer/songwriter with five albums (as of 2011)
 Jonathan D. Krane, film producer, Look Who's Talking, Face/Off
 Jeremy Leven, author, screenwriter and director whose works include Don Juan DeMarco
 Lhasa de Sela, singer-songwriter
 Glenn Yarbrough, original lead tenor of The Limeliters
 Lee David Zlotoff, creator of MacGyver; director of The Spitfire Grill (1996), which won the Audience Award at the Sundance Film Festival

Businesspeople 
James H. Frame, computer programming pioneer at IBM, and former vice president of software at ITT; founded James Frame Enterprises (JFE), a software development consulting company
Eugene V. Thaw, American art dealer and collector
Warren Winiarski, founder of Stag's Leap Wine Cellars

Chefs 
Daniel Rose (chef) Chef with restaurants in Paris (Spring, La Bourse et la Vie) and New York City (Le Coucou)
Miyoko Schinner, American chef, cookbook author, animal sanctuary founder and owner of cheese brand Miyoko's Creamery

Scientists 
Cynthia Keppel, physicist
Aron Wall 2019 Breakthrough New Horizons in Physics Prize for fundamental insights about quantum information, quantum field theory and gravity.

Others 
Charles Van Doren, garnered notoriety for his involvement in the rigged game show Twenty-One

Board Members 
 Austin Ligon, co-founder/CEO (retired), CarMax, Inc.
 James T. Woodward, banker and owner of a major Thoroughbred horse dynasty and member of St. John's board of visitors, recipient of the honorary degree of Doctor of Laws in 1909; namesake of Woodward Hall

References 

St. John's College people
St. John's